This is the list of traditional Indian dances.

A
Andhra natyam (Art dance of Andhra Pradesh and Telangana, South India)

B
 Bagurumba (folk dance of Assam, North East India)
 Bhortal (folk dance of Assam, North East India)
 Bhangra (Folk Dance of Punjab, North India)
 Bharatnatyam (Tamil Nadu, South India)
 Bihu dance (Folk dance of Assam, East India)
 Bathukamma (Folk dance of Telangana, South India)
 Vaikuntha  (Folk Dance of India, Asia)

C
 Chhau (Odisha, West Bengal, East India)
 Chholiya (Uttarakhand)

D
 Dollu Kunitha (Folk Dance Of Karnataka, India)
 Dandiya (Folk dance of Gujarat, West India)
 Deodhani (Folk dance of Assam, North East India)
 Dhangari (Folk dance of Maharashtra, West India)
 Dhemsa  (Tribal dance of Koraput, Odisha)
 Domkach (Folk dance of Bihar and Jharkhand)
 Dekhni (attractive mixture of folk culture and western music came into existence during Portuguese ruling goa)

F
 Firkal (Folk dance of Jharkhand and Odisha)

G
 Garba (Folk dance of Gujarat, West India)
 Giddha (folk dance of Punjab North India)
 Ghoomar (folk dance of Rajasthan West India)
 Gaudiya Nritya (Classical dance of West Bengal)
 Geraiya Nritya (folk tribe dance of Gujarat, India
 Ghumura (Odisha)

J
 Jhumair (folk dance of Jharkhand, Chhattisgarh, Odisha, West Bengal Assam(jhumur)

K
 Kamsale  (folk dance of Karnataka )
 Kathak (Uttar Pradesh, Classical Indian Dance)
 Kathakali (Kerala, India, Incorporates dance)
 Kerala Natanam (Indian Dance created by Guru Gopinath)
 Krishnanattam
 Kuchipudi (Classical Indian Dance, Andhra Pradesh)
 Kolattam (folk Tamil Nadu)
 Koli Dance (Folk Maharashtra)
 Karakattam (folk Tamil Nadu)
 Kanyarkali (Folk Dance, Kerala

L
 Lavani (Folk Dance, Maharashtra)
Lambadi (Folk Dance, Telangana and Andhra Pradesh)

M
 Mohiniattam (Indian classical dance from Kerala)
 Manipuri  (Indian classical dance from Manipur)
 Matki Dance – Madhya Pradesh
 Mardana Jhumar - Jharkhand
 Margamkalli- dance form performed by the St. Thomas Christians community of Kerala

N
Nandi Dwaja ನಂದಿ ಧ್ವಜ (folk dance of Karnataka ಕರ್ನಾಟಕ)
Nati dance (Folk dance of Himachal Pradesh, India.
Nautanki (dance form of Uttar Pradesh)

O
 Odissi aka Orissi (Odisha, East India) (Indian classical dance from Odisha)
 Ojapali (folk dance of Assam, North East India)
 oyilattam aka oyilattam (Madurai, Tamil Nadu)

P
 Patta ಪಟ್ಟ (folk dance of Karnataka ಕರ್ನಾಟಕ)
 Panthi (folk dance of Chhattisgarh, India)
 Parai Attam (Tamil Nadu)
 Puliyattam (folk dance of Tamil Nadu, India)
 Perini shiva thandavam (dance form of Telangana) Perini Sivatandavam
 Pulikali – Kerala
 Popir - Arunachal Pradesh

R
 Raut Nacha (Folk dance of Chhattisgarh, India)
 Raas lila  (Indian Classical Dance)
 Rathwa dance (Folk dance of Chhota Udaipur India)

S
 Soma Kunita ಸೋಮ ಕುಣಿತ (Folk Dance of Karnataka)
 Sambalpuri (dance from Odisha)(semi-classical dance of India)
 Sattriya (Dance form of Assam)

T
 Thirayattam (Ethnic Dance of Kerala) 
 Tamasa (Folk dance, Maharashtra)
 Tera Taali (Rajasthan)
 Thiruvathira (Kerala)

V
 Veeragaase ವೀರಗಾಸೆ (folk dance of Karnataka, South India)
 Vilasini Natyam (art dance of Andhra Pradesh, South India)

Y
 Yakshagana ಯಕ್ಷಗಾನ (Karavali Region of Karnataka)

See also
 List of Indian classical dance and music events
 Indian classical dance
 List of Indian folk dances
 Folk dance in India
 List of ethnic, regional, and folk dances by origin

References